Uematsu is a Japanese surname. Notable people with the name include:

Daihachirō Uematsu (born 1946/47), Japan Self-Defense Forces general and kendo teacher in Finland
, Japanese politician
, Japanese speed skater
, Japanese speed skater
Kenji Uematsu (born 1976), Spanish judoka
Kiyoshi Uematsu (born 1978), Spanish judoka
, Japanese Anglican bishop and Primate of the Nippon Sei Ko Kai
, Japanese video game composer and musician
, perpetrator of the Sagamihara stabbings
Taira Uematsu (born 1983), Japanese baseball coach
Tadao Uematsu (born 1962), Japanese racecar driver
, Japanese female professional wrestler

Fictional characters
, a character in the manga series Pita-Ten

See also
Amy Uyematsu (born 1947), Japanese-American poet

Japanese-language surnames